"Illinois" is the regional anthem (or state song) of the U.S. state of Illinois. Written in the early 1890s by Civil War veteran Charles H. Chamberlain, the verses were set to the tune of "Baby Mine," a popular song composed in 1870 by Archibald Johnston (died 1887).  "Illinois" became the state song by an act of the 54th Illinois General Assembly in 1925.

History
The song was written during the successful campaign to have the 1893 World's Columbian Exposition located in Chicago. It was intended for Colonel O.B. Knight, a friend of Mr. Chamberlin, to sing in Illinois and Washington D.C. as support for the nomination of Illinois to host the fair.

Walter Howe Jones (died 1933), Director of the University of Illinois School of Music from 1895 to 1901, set the song lyrics to his own music for male voices in 1901. His version was published in several campus song books but was not widely used.

In 1925, Florence Fifer Bohrer (1877-1960) of Bloomington, daughter of Governor Joseph W. Fifer (1840-1938) and the first woman Illinois state senator, introduced the bill making "Illinois" with Johnston's melody the official state song. The bill was passed on 30 June 1925.

Colonel Armin F. Hand (1882?-1966) of Chicago composed a stylized version of the song titled "Governor's March (Illinois)" for marching band in 1935, and dedicated it to Governor Henry Horner (1879-1940). In 1949, the University of Illinois football band, the Marching Illini, conducted by Everett Kisinger (1912-1990) adapted this march as their pregame "Entrance No. 3" played before each home game. It was revised by James Curnow in 1972.

In addition to the original four verses of the lyrics, two more were written in 1966 by folk singer Win Stracke (1908-1991) for the 1968 Illinois Sesquicentennial. A marching band arrangement by John Warrington (1911-1978) was issued at the same time.

In 2018 the Illinois House of Representatives passed HR 184, a resolution encouraging the playing of "Illinois" at government events, commencement exercises, and other events at state universities. The resolution was drafted by Chicago author Stan "Tex" Banash and introduced by State Representative Michael P. McAuliffe.

Lyrics

The following verses were written by Win Stracke in 1966:

See also
 List of Illinois state symbols

References

External links
 Sheet music for "Illinois"
 Official State Song from Illinois Government site. 

Songs about Illinois
Symbols of Illinois
United States state songs